The Spanish Armed Forces are in charge of guaranteeing the sovereignty and independence of the Kingdom of Spain, defending its territorial integrity and the constitutional order, according to the functions entrusted to them by the Constitution of 1978. They are composed of: the Army, the Air and Space Force, the Navy, the Royal Guard and the Military Emergencies Unit, as well as the so-called Common Corps.

Spain is one of the most militarily powerful nations of the European Union (EUFOR) and Eurocorps. It also occupies a prominent position in the structure of NATO, which it joined in 1982. It also has the oldest Marine Infantry in the world and the oldest permanent military units in the world: the Infantry Regiment "Inmemorial del Rey" No. 1 and the Infantry Regiment "Soria" No. 9.

History

During the 15th and 16th century, Spain evolved into Europe's foremost power with the voyages of Christopher Columbus leading to Spain acquiring vast lands in the Americas. During the reign of Charles V and Philip II, Spain reached the peak of its power with the Spanish Empire spanning 19.4 million square km of the earth's surface, a total of 13%. By the mid 17th century this power had been weakened by the Thirty Years War along with financial problems, and the lack of reforms.

During the 18th century the new Bourbon dynasty revived Spain's economic and military power through a series of important reforms in the armed forces and the economy, notably those of Charles III of Spain. Thanks to these reforms, Spain performed well during the war of Jenkins' Ear, the war of Austrian Succession but with mixed result during the Seven Years' War. Spain had recovered considerably by the outbreak of the French Revolution. The occupation of a great part of Spain by the French during the Napoleonic Wars resulted in the so-called war of Spanish independence, which was characterised by use on a large scale of guerrilla troops, made necessary by the war's devastating effect on the Spanish economy. Following the war, the Spanish military was in poor condition and political instability resulted in the loss of most of Spain's former colonies, except Cuba, Puerto Rico, and the Philippines. These too would be lost later in the Spanish–American War.

In the 20th century, the Spanish armed forces did not intervene in the First World War (neutrality) or in the Second World War (no active belligerence), although they did intervene in the Spanish Civil War and in some colonial conflicts. After the arrival of democracy in 1978, they underwent a strong modernization process, becoming modern armed forces. In 1982 Spain entered NATO.

Recently, in the last decades of the 20th century and the first decades of the 21st, Spanish troops have participated together with their Western allies in operations such as Gulf War, NATO bombing of Yugoslavia, KFOR, War on terror, 2011 military intervention in Libya, Combined Task Force 150 or UNIFIL, to name a few examples.

Today

Spain participated along with France, the United Kingdom, Italy, Denmark, the United States and Canada in the 2011 intervention against Muammar Gaddafi in Libya, contributing a tanker, 4 F/A-18 Hornet fighter jets, a frigate, a submarine and a surveillance aircraft, along with logistical support from the Naval Station Rota and the Morón Air Base.

Spain has belonged to NATO since 1982. The decision was ratified in the 1986 referendum by the Spanish people. The conditions were the reduction of American military bases, non-integration of Spain in the military structure of NATO, and the prohibition of introducing nuclear weapons in Spain.

Current missions
As of June 2017, 3,093 soldiers of the Spanish Armed Forces and the Civil Guard are part of the nineteen operations where Spain has an active role.

According to the National Security Department of Spain (DSN), these are the current missions of the armed forces and civil guard:

Missions with the European Union
EUTM Mali (2013–present): Advisory mission in the security and training sector of the Malian National Army. 130 deployed military personnel.
EUTM CAR (2016–present): Training mission of the Armed Forces of the Government of the Central African Republic. The Eurocorps is in charge of carrying out this mission. 19 military deployed.
EUTM SOMALIA (2010–present): Training mission of the Somali Armed Forces, with the cooperation of the UN and the African Union. 16 military deployed.
Operation Atalanta (2008–present): Mission to combat piracy in the Indian Ocean as well as protection of the UN food program. 338 deployed military.
EUFOR ALTHEA BOSNIA (2004–present): Advisory mission to the Armed Forces of Bosnia and Herzegovina. 3 military deployed.
 EUNAVFOR MED-SOPHIA (2015–present): Mission to combat trafficking in human beings and prevention of loss of life in the Mediterranean. 261 deployed military personnel.

Missions with NATO
 Operation Sea Guardian (2016–present): Mission to fight against terrorism in the Mediterranean. 119 military deployed.
 SNMG1 / SNMG2 / SNMCMG2: NATO first-responder permanent naval units. 251 deployed military personnel.
 Baltic Air Policing (2004–present): Mission to protect the airspace of Estonia, Latvia and Lithuania. 128 deployed military personnel.
 Enhanced Forward Presence (2017–present): Mission of presence of NATO in the Baltic Sea region following the annexation of Crimea by Russia. 310 military deployed.
Operation Active Fence (2015–present): Mission to reinforce Turkey's air defense against the threat of ballistic missiles from Syria. 149 deployed military personnel.

 Missions with UN
 UNIFIL (2006–present): Peacekeeping Monitoring Mission between Lebanon and Israel. 620 soldiers and civil guards deployed.
 UN COLOMBIA (2016–present): Mission of observers of the peace process in Colombia. 14 deployed military personnel.
Coalition against Daesh
 INHERENT RESOLVE (2015–present): Training mission of Iraqi forces to fight the Daesh. 463 soldiers and civil guards deployed.
Security cooperation with France
Support for Mali-Senegal (2013–present): Military support to France to facilitate air transport of French and EU operations in Mali and Sahel. 61 military deployed.
Support for the Central African Republic (2013–present): Military support for France and the EU to facilitate air transport in its operations. 45 military deployed.
 National missions of cooperation with Senegal and Cape Verde
 Support for Senegal (2016–present): Cooperative security activities with other countries. 34 deployed military personnel.
 Support for Cape Verde (2016–present): Cooperative security activities with other countries. 59 deployed military personnel.

The Spanish Armed Forces also participated in the last few years in other missions, above all humanitarian and observation: in Albania in 1999, Mozambique in 2000, Republic of Macedonia in 2001, Haiti in 2004 and Indonesia in 2005. In 2006, Spain participated in Darfur, Sudan
by sending observers, and in the Democratic Republic of the Congo. Spain also participated in the Iraq War between 2003 and 2004, in Gabon and in Senegal to safeguard maritime traffic in the Horn of Africa (with 33 Civil Guards and national police officers, two patrol vessels and a helicopter). In 2015, 46 UME soldiers and 12 Civil Guards of the High Mountain Group went to help and rescue in the Nepal earthquake, along with six dogs, three scientific police and a Boeing 707 of supplies transport of the Air and Space Force.

The cost of these missions abroad amounts to approximately 800 million euros per year.

Command structure

The commander in chief of the Armed Forces is the King of Spain; with the ex officio rank of Capitán General in the Army, Navy and Air and Space Force. The Spanish Constitution of 1978 states in article 62(h) that the King of Spain shall have "supreme command of the Armed Forces"; however under article 64, all official acts of the King must be countersigned by the President of the Government (or other competent minister) to become valid.

The President of the Government (also known as Prime Minister in English translations), as the head of government, is responsible under article 97 for "domestic and foreign policy, civil and military administration and the defense of the State", and thus bears the ultimate responsibility before the Cortes Generales, and the Spanish electorate.

The Minister of defense is in charge of running the Ministry of defense, which carries out the day-to-day administration of the forces. The President of the Government and the Minister of defense are civilians. No provision in the Constitution requires the Government to seek approval from the Cortes Generales before sending the armed forces abroad.

The Chief of the Defense Staff  directs the Defense Staff and is the senior military advisor to the Minister and the Government. The military leadership of the three military services are: the Chief of Staff of the Army, the Chief of Staff of the Air and Space Force and the Chief of Staff of the Navy.

The structure, and incumbents , are:

  Commander in Chief: Capitán General of the Armed Forces the King of Spain, Felipe VI.
  President of the Government: The President Pedro Sánchez.
  Minister of Defence: Margarita Robles.
  Chief of the defense Staff: Admiral General Teodoro E. López Calderón.
 The Chiefs of Staff of the branches:
  Chief of Staff of the Army: Army General Amador Fernando Enseñat y Berea.
  Chief of Staff of the Navy: Admiral General Antonio Martorell Lacave.
  Chief of Staff of the Air and Space Force: Air and Space General Javier Salto Martínez-Avial.

Branches
The Spanish armed forces are a professional force with a strength in 2017 of 121,900 active personnel and 4,770 reserve personnel. The country also has the 77,000 strong Civil Guard which comes under the control of the Ministry of defense in times of a national emergency. The Spanish defense budget is 5.71 billion euros (US$7.2 billion) a 1% increase for 2015. The increase comes because of security concerns in the country.

Army
 Annex: Materials of the Spanish Army (Spanish wiki)
The Spanish Army consists of 15 active brigades and 6 military regions. Modern infantry have diverse capabilities and this is reflected in the varied roles assigned to them. There are four operational roles that infantry battalions can fulfil: air assault, armoured infantry, mechanised infantry, and light role infantry.

Navy

Under the command of the Spanish Admiral Chief of Naval Staff, stationed in Madrid, the Spanish Navy has four area commands: 
 Cantabrian Maritime Zone with its headquarters at Ferrol on the Atlantic coast
 Straits Maritime Zone with its headquarters at San Fernando near Cadiz
 Mediterranean Maritime Zone with its headquarters at Cartagena
 Canary Islands Maritime Zone with its headquarters at Las Palmas de Gran Canaria.

The current flagship of the Spanish Navy is the amphibious assault ship/aircraft carrier . In addition, the fleet consists of: 2 amphibious transport docks, 11 frigates, 3 submarines, 6 mine countermeasure vessels, 23 patrol vessels and a number of auxiliary ships. The total displacement of the Spanish Navy is approximately 220,000 tonnes. As of 2012, the Armada has a strength of 20,838 personnel.

Marines

The Marines, in Spanish, Infanteria de Marina, are the marine infantry of the Spanish Navy, the oldest in the world. It has a strength of 5,000 troops divided into base defense forces and landing forces. One of the three base defense battalions is stationed with each of the Navy headquarters. "Groups" (midway between battalions and regiments) are stationed in Madrid and Las Palmas de Gran Canaria. The Tercio (fleet — regiment equivalent) is available for immediate embarkation and based out of San Fernando. Its principal weapons include light tanks, armored combat vehicles, self-propelled artillery, and SPIKE antitank missiles.

Air and Space Force

Spanish Air and Space Force currently has 10 fighter squadrons, each with 18-24 airplanes. The Air and Space Force also has 15 operational air bases around the country. The Air and Space Force operates a wide-ranging fleet of aircraft, from fighters to transport aircraft and passenger transports to helicopters. It maintains some 450 aircraft in total, of which around 130 are fighter aircraft (Eurofighter Typhoons and F-18 MLU). The Spanish Air and Space Force is replacing older aircraft in the inventory with newer ones including the recently introduced Eurofighter Typhoon and the Airbus A400M Atlas airlifter. Both are manufactured with Spanish participation; EADS CASA makes the Eurofighter's right wing and leading edge slats, and participates in the testing and assembly of the airlifter. Its aerobatic display team is the Patrulla Aguila, which flies the CASA C-101 Aviojet.Its helicopter display team, Patrulla Aspa, flies the Eurocopter EC-120 Colibrí. In July 2014 the Spanish Air Force joined the European Air Transport Command, headquartered at Eindhoven Airbase in the Netherlands.

Common Corps 
The Common Corps are four corps that provide professional services to all the branches of the Armed Forces and the Civil Guard. The Common Corps were created in the 1980s to unify the specialist corps of the different branches for operational reasons. The Common Corps are:
 Military Legal Corps
 Military Comptroller Corps
 Military Medical Corps
 Military Band Corps

Royal Guard

The Royal Guard (Guardia Real) is an independent unit of the Spanish Armed Forces whose primary task is the military protection of the King of Spain and the Spanish Royal Family. It also protects visiting Heads of State.

The Royal Guard's history dates back to medieval times, the Corps of Gentlemen of the Chamber, the "Monteros de Espinosa", dating to 1006.

It currently has a strength of 1,900 troops, constituting a fully functional combat unit drawn from the ranks of all three branches of the Spanish Armed Forces:  among others, a Marines company, a Paratroop company and an infantry company. Some units have served recently in Afghanistan and Bosnia.

Military Emergencies Unit

The Military Emergencies Unit, is the most recently instituted branch of the Spanish Armed Forces, resulting from a decision of the Council of Ministers of Spain in 2005.

In addition to headquarters staff (there are five emergency intervention battalions (BIEM), a support regiment and an aerial group.

It is responsible for providing disaster relief principally throughout Spain but also if necessary abroad. The activities including handling natural hazards such as floods and earthquakes, forest fires, chemical and nuclear accidents, and other emergency situations recognized as such by the Prime Minister of Spain.

Citations

References

Further reading
 Jane's defense Weekly, Country Survey: Spain, JDW 18 April 1992, p. 655-onwards

External links
  Foro Militar General - Spanish Military forum

Military of Spain
Permanent Structured Cooperation